Synapturanus mirandaribeiroi is a species of frog in the family Microhylidae.
It is found in Brazil, Colombia, French Guiana, Guyana, Suriname, and Venezuela.
Its natural habitat is subtropical or tropical moist lowland forests.
It is threatened by habitat loss.

References

mirandaribeiroi
Amphibians of Brazil
Amphibians of Colombia
Amphibians of French Guiana
Amphibians of Guyana
Amphibians of Suriname
Amphibians of Venezuela
Amphibians described in 1975
Taxonomy articles created by Polbot